3C-MAL is a psychedelic phenethylamine with structural similarities to methallylescaline. Little information exists on the human pharmacology of 3C-MAL and it has little-to-no history of human use.

See also
2C-T-3
3C-AL
3C-P
Substituted phenethylamine

References

External links
 Explore 3C-MAL | Pihkal.info

Mescalines
Substituted amphetamines
O-methylated phenols